Marple may refer to:

Places 
 Marple, Greater Manchester, a town close to Stockport, in England
 Marple Bridge, a village within the Metropolitan Borough of Stockport, in Greater Manchester
 Marple railway station in Marple, Greater Manchester 
 Marple Township, Delaware County, Pennsylvania, in the United States

People 
 Carole Marple (born 1941), Australian politician
 Stan Marple, a Canadian ice hockey player and coach
 Miss Marple, a fictional character created by Agatha Christie

Television 
 Agatha Christie's Marple (aka Marple), a British TV series from 2004 to 2013, with Geraldine McEwan and later Julia McKenzie
 Miss Marple (TV series), a British TV series from 1984 to 1992, with Joan Hickson

Software 
 MARPLE, software for crop epidemiology